Gnathoenia congoana is a species of beetle in the family Cerambycidae. It was described by Belon in 1901. It is known from the Democratic Republic of the Congo. It contains the varietas Gnathoenia congoana var. reticulata.

References

Ceroplesini
Beetles described in 1901
Endemic fauna of the Democratic Republic of the Congo